Gold Bar is a city in Snohomish County, Washington, United States. It is located on the Skykomish River between Sultan and Index, connected by U.S. Route 2. The population was 2,403 at the 2020 census.

History
The area around modern-day Gold Bar was occupied by the Skykomish, a branch of the Snohomish people, prior to the arrival of American settlers. The Skykomish had a permanent village near Gold Bar that was named . Gold Bar started as a prospectors camp in 1869, named by a miner who found traces of gold on a river gravel bar. After Gold Bar became a construction camp for the Great Northern Railway, anti-Chinese sentiment was inflamed by a shooting fray started by disreputable camp followers. To save the lives of the threatened Chinese, construction engineer Eduard Bauer slipped them out of camp in hastily constructed coffins. Gold Bar was officially incorporated on September 16, 1910. The 1940 population was 307.

In 2012, the city government considered disincorporation to avoid bankruptcy due to low sales tax revenue and high expenses attributed to filling public records requests and fighting lawsuits from an activist. The city council voted against disincorporation and placed a property tax levy on the ballot, which was rejected by voters in November 2012.

Geography
The city center is bordered to the south by the Skykomish River and to the north by Mays Creek.

Climate
The climate in this area has mild differences between highs and lows, and there is adequate rainfall year-round. According to the Köppen Climate Classification system, Gold Bar has a marine west coast climate, abbreviated "Cfb" on climate maps.

Demographics

2010 census
As of the census of 2010, there were 2,075 people, 782 households, and 519 families living in the city. The racial makeup of the city was 85.1% White, 0.6% African American, 0.7% Native American, 1.0% Asian, 0.7% Pacific Islander, 7.0% from other races, and 4.9% from two or more races. Hispanic or Latino of any race were 10.1% of the population.

There were 782 households, of which 37.9% had children under the age of 18 living with them, 48.1% were married couples living together, 10.6% had a female householder with no husband present, 7.7% had a male householder with no wife present, and 33.6% were non-families. 27.1% of all households were made up of individuals, and 6.6% had someone living alone who was 65 years of age or older. The average household size was 2.65 and the average family size was 3.20.

The median age in the city was 36.6 years. 26.4% of residents were under the age of 18; 8.7% were between the ages of 18 and 24; 29.1% were from 25 to 44; 28.8% were from 45 to 64; and 7% were 65 years of age or older. The gender makeup of the city was 52.8% male and 47.2% female.

2000 census
As of the census of 2000, there were 2,014 people, 705 households, and 525 families living in the city. The population density was 1,887.2 people per square mile (726.7/km2). There were 769 housing units at an average density of 720.6 per square mile (277.5/km2). The racial makeup of the city was 91.56% White, 0.40% African American, 0.70% Native American, 1.29% Asian, 0.40% Pacific Islander, 1.39% from other races, and 4.27% from two or more races. Hispanic or Latino of any race were 3.28% of the population.

There were 705 households, out of which 44.8% had children under the age of 18 living with them, 57.7% were married couples living together, 11.2% had a female householder with no husband present, and 25.5% were non-families. 18.7% of all households were made up of individuals, and 5.1% had someone living alone who was 65 years of age or older. The average household size was 2.86 and the average family size was 3.30.

In the city, the age distribution of the population shows 33.5% under the age of 18, 7.3% from 18 to 24, 35.2% from 25 to 44, 17.3% from 45 to 64, and 6.7% who were 65 years of age or older. The median age was 31 years. For every 100 females, there were 108.5 males. For every 100 females age 18 and over, there were 97.9 males.

The median income for a household in the city was $45,714, and the median income for a family was $48,152. Males had a median income of $40,250 versus $25,815 for females. The per capita income for the city was $18,712. About 5.6% of families and 7.1% of the population were below the poverty line, including 11.3% of those under age 18 and 2.4% of those age 65 or over.

Attractions
Gold Bar is known as a white-water rafting destination for those seeking to float the Skykomish River.
One of the most popular low elevation hikes in the metro Seattle area, the trail to Wallace Falls, is located on the north margin of the city. More than 160,000 people visit Wallace Falls State Park annually.

Gold Bar hosts the Gold Dust days every fourth weekend in July. It is a street fair with vendors selling wares, local music, and food. Traditionally, there is also a car show that takes place on the Saturday of the weekend.

Government
Gold Bar is a noncharter code city with a mayor–council government. The city's residents elect a mayor and five members to the city council, all serving four-year terms from at-large seats. The city council serves as the legislative body, while the mayor is empowered to cast tiebreaking votes in addition to their normal duties as the administrator of the city government.

Gold Bar was annexed into the Sno-Isle Libraries system in 1997, becoming the second-to-last municipality in Snohomish County to join.

In popular culture
Gold Bar, along with neighboring Sultan and Index, was a filming location for the 2016 film Captain Fantastic.

References

External links
City website

Cities in Washington (state)
Cities in Snohomish County, Washington